Sahl Nineveh Sport Club (Arabic: نادي سهل نينوى الرياضي), is an Iraqi football team based in Nineveh, that plays in the Iraq Division Two.

See also 

 2020–21 Iraq FA Cup
 Iraq Division Two

References 

Football teams
Football clubs in Nineveh